Relative abundance can refer to

 Relative species abundance in ecological communities.
 Natural abundance of isotopes of a chemical element in nature.